Joseph C. Frank (1915-1981) was a professional American football player for the Philadelphia Eagles of the National Football League. However, he was also a member of the "Steagles", a team that was the result of a temporary merger between the Eagles and Pittsburgh Steelers due to the league-wide manning shortages in 1943 brought on by World War II. Prior to his professional career, Joe played at the college level while attending Georgetown University.

References
List of Georgetown University players in the NFL

External links

1915 births
1981 deaths
Sportspeople from the Bronx
Players of American football from New York City
Georgetown Hoyas football players
Place of death missing
Philadelphia Eagles players
Steagles players and personnel